Rising '44: The Battle for Warsaw is the title of a documented and illustrated historical account of the Warsaw Uprising by the historian Norman Davies. It was mostly well received by specialists and commentators during its publication.

One controversy surrounding the book is that Davies purposely anglicised most of the Polish proper names, including placenames and pseudonyms used by Polish conspirators, to bring the reality of events closer to English-speaking readers and to help them concentrate on the narrative, rather than on the complexity of Polish names. 

However, the Polish historian Jan Ciechanowski has taken grave exception to the work in more general terms:

In the hands of Davies the Warsaw Rising has become his personal "plaything", the outpouring of his uncommonly overactive imagination, his huge arrogance and of his vast fantasy. In fact his knowledge about the Warsaw Rising is actually limited.

Ciechanowski has accused the author of so littering the book with factual and interpretative errors, "the number of all manner of errors in Davies' work is such, as to render his account of the Rising not wholly credible".

References

External links
 Carlo D'Este, "'Warsaw Will Be Liquidated'", review in The New York Times, July 25, 2004
 Krzysztof Renik, "Read All About It", review in Warsaw Voice, September 1, 2004

2003 non-fiction books
History books about World War II
Warsaw Uprising
Books by Norman Davies
History books about Poland
21st-century history books